A Long Haul is a 2010, documentary film about Montauk, NY charter boat captain Bart Ritchie and his struggles with the effects of a declining economy and governmental regulations on the fishing industry. The film was produced and directed by Nathaniel Kramer, who, in addition to being a filmmaker, is a photographer and recreational fisherman. The film has been well received, screening as an official selection in numerous festivals including: the Astoria/LIC International Film Festival, DocMiami International Film Festival, Connecticut Film Festival, EdinDocs, Lighthouse Film Festival, New Filmmakers New York, Philadelphia Independent Film Festival, The IndieFest, Accolade Festival, and won Best Documentary Short Film, Best Director, and Best Cinematography for a Short Documentary at the Los Angeles Movie Awards.

Cast
Bart Ritchie: Captain
Kurtis Briand: First Mate
Leighton Brillo-Sonnino

References

External links

March 18, 2010 article from TheFin.com
March 11, 2010 article from the New York Post 
Ellis Henican awards Nathaniel Kramer "Long Islander of the Week"
August 27, 2010 article on Dan's Hamptons

2010 films
American documentary films
2010 documentary films
Documentary films about fishing
2010s English-language films
2010s American films